James Edward O'Brien (born 1972) is a British radio presenter, podcaster, author, and former tabloid journalist and television presenter. Since 2004, he has been a presenter for talk station LBC, on weekdays between 10am and 1pm, hosting a phone-in discussion of current affairs, views and real-life experiences. Between October 2017 and November 2018, he hosted a weekly interview series with JOE titled Unfiltered with James O'Brien. He has occasionally presented BBC's Newsnight.

Early life
O'Brien was born to a teenaged single mother and was adopted, at the age of 28 days, by Jim O'Brien, later a journalist for The Daily Telegraph, and his wife. At the time of James's birth, Jim was working on the Doncaster Evening News. He was educated at the Catholic independent Ampleforth College and later read Philosophy & Economics at the London School of Economics.

Journalism
Prior to his broadcasting career, O'Brien was an editor of the Daily Express gossip column written under the pseudonym William Hickey. He has also written for the Daily Mail, Cosmopolitan and The Spectator. In 2015 the book Loathe Thy Neighbour, which examined attitudes towards immigration, was published by Elliott & Thompson.

In 2018 the book How To Be Right... in a World gone Wrong, in which O'Brien offers his opinions on various current affairs, was published and reached fifth position in The Sunday Times Top 10 best sellers' list in December that year. His third book, How Not to Be Wrong: The Art of Changing Your Mind, was published by W. H. Allen in 2020 and is described as a "candid account of childhood, therapy and the times he's been the one who needed a good talking to." A recent family crisis convinced O'Brien to try therapy; although deeply sceptical, it soon made him feel "as though someone had lifted medicine balls off both my shoulders".

Broadcasting
From 2000 to 2002, O'Brien was a panellist on the Channel 5 programme The Wright Stuff. In early 2001, he presented A Knight with O'Brien, a talk show on Anglia Television.

With his wife, Lucy O'Brien (née McDonald), he fronted Channel 5's 2001 general election talk show 5 Talk, securing a review from Clive James, who wrote: "James, in particular, is a pink-shirted walking encyclopedia of political savvy".

LBC
O'Brien first appeared on LBC during 2002 as a holiday cover presenter. His own weekly programme began in January 2003 and he became a full-time presenter in 2004. Regular features of his show include the "Mystery Hour," in which listeners phone in with various things that puzzle them and other callers attempt to give a solution.

O'Brien made national headlines in April 2009 when footballer Frank Lampard phoned his show to object to tabloid stories about his private life and O'Brien's discussion of them. Lampard's former fiancée, Elen Rivas, had alleged that Frank Lampard had turned their home into a bachelor pad while she and Lampard's children were living in a rented flat. Lampard phoned in, objecting to the assertion that he was "weak" and "scum" and said that he had fought "tooth and nail" to keep his family together. Public comments on Lampard's reaction praised Lampard's "brave" and "articulate" handling of the situation. The exchange later earned O'Brien, who defended his conduct in an equally heated exchange with Kay Burley on Sky News, a Bronze Award in the Best Interview category of the 2010 Sony Radio Academy Awards.

In 2013, O'Brien clashed with Work and Pensions Secretary Iain Duncan Smith in an argument over the Government's work programmes. In May 2014, O'Brien interviewed UKIP leader Nigel Farage. During the interview, O'Brien picked up on Farage's comment that he felt uncomfortable on a train at not being able to hear anyone speaking English. Farage was also criticised by O'Brien for misinterpreting having English as a second language as being unable to speak English at all and for saying he would be concerned if a group of Romanian men moved in next door to him. In October 2014, O'Brien breached broadcasting rules by his remarks during the Clacton by-election.

Throughout 2014 and 2015, O'Brien gave much air time and promotion to false claims of VIP sex abuse by the now discredited Exaro News website, which were based on testimony from Carl Beech, later sentenced to prison for perverting the course of justice and child sex offences, something O'Brien later expressed regret for on Twitter.

O'Brien has claimed to be politically homeless, being against the British Left such as the Labour party under Jeremy Corbyn, but enjoys support from the liberal media of British politics e.g. the New Statesman and The Guardian. He enjoys the freedom that LBC gives him to express his views. O'Brien frequently discusses Brexit with callers who voted to leave the EU in the 2016 United Kingdom European Union membership referendum, often claiming Leave voters had been deceived by the pro-Brexit campaigns to vote against their own interests.

Television
O'Brien began occasionally guest presenting on the BBC Two programme Newsnight in August 2014. Following the widespread interest in O'Brien's interview with Farage, it was speculated he would be a permanent replacement for longtime host Jeremy Paxman, who intended to step down. The job was ultimately taken by Evan Davis. O'Brien left Newsnight in January 2018 after being criticised for his anti-Brexit and anti-Trump views, which were felt to be out of step with the corporation's policy on neutrality. He departed on good terms, saying the BBC still had the finest selection of journalists in the world.

In 2015, O'Brien presented a chat show for ITV called O'Brien, which aired for ten episodes.

Podcast
In October 2017, O'Brien began hosting a podcast at JOE.co.uk titled Unfiltered with James O'Brien, which ran until November 2018. Guests have included Russell Brand, Alastair Campbell, Lily Allen, Jon Ronson, Gary Lineker and Sir Nick Clegg.

A new podcast was started in March 2019 titled Full Disclosure with James O'Brien. The first guest to appear on the show was former Prime Minister Tony Blair. Other guests included David Mitchell, Nicky Campbell, Margaret Atwood and Michael Morpurgo.

Political activism
O'Brien has stated that he voted for Boris Johnson in the 2008 Mayoral Election, though he now regrets his vote.

O'Brien is an anti-Brexit campaigner and was part of the People's Vote campaign for a second Brexit referendum. He gave a speech at a People's Vote March "Put It to the People" on 23 March 2019 and at the People's Vote rally on 9 April 2019.

Personal life
O'Brien is married to Lucy McDonald and has two daughters. Politically, O'Brien prefers to be described as 'liberal' rather than 'left-wing'. O'Brien was raised in the Roman Catholic faith and refers to himself as a Christian. He is a Kidderminster Harriers F.C. fan.

Books 
 Loathe Thy Neighbour, 2015, Elliott and Thompson
 How To Be Right... in a World gone Wrong, 2018, W. H. Allen
 How Not to Be Wrong: The Art of Changing Your Mind, 2020, W. H. Allen

References

External links

 James O'Brien on LBC
 
 

1972 births
Living people
People educated at Ampleforth College
Alumni of the London School of Economics
English people of Irish descent
British radio presenters
British television talk show hosts
British podcasters
People from Kidderminster
People from the London Borough of Hackney
English adoptees
English Christians
LBC radio presenters
Liberalism in the United Kingdom